Don Francisco Cantera Burgos (Miranda de Ebro, 1901 - Madrid, 1978) was a Spanish historian. He received worldwide recognition for his studies on Jewish culture in Spain.

He studied law at the University of Valladolid and philosophy at Universidad Central de Madrid. He co-founded the Arias Montano Institute and the magazine Sepharad, where he published countless articles. Following the creation of the institute, he served as the first director of the Sephardic Museum in Toledo, Spain.

He was responsible for the translation of the Old Testament in the Bóver-Cantera, Cantera-Iglesias, and Cantera-Pabón Spanish Catholic bible translations. His 1952 work on the Teresa de Cartagena and the Santa María-Cartagena family, the most powerful converso family in late-medieval Spain, remains the standard reference work for the subject.

References

External links
http://www.fundacioncantera.org

1901 births
1978 deaths
People from Miranda de Ebro
Historians of Jews and Judaism
Spanish humanists
20th-century Spanish historians